Avatha javanica is a species of moth of the family Erebidae. It is found on Java.

References

Moths described in 1941
Avatha
Moths of Indonesia